Auneau-Bleury-Saint-Symphorien is a commune in the Eure-et-Loir department in northern France. The municipality was established on 1 January 2016 by merger of the former communes of Auneau and Bleury-Saint-Symphorien. Bleury-Saint-Symphorien was the result of the merger, on 1 January 2012, of the communes of Bleury and Saint-Symphorien-le-Château.

Population

See also
Communes of the Eure-et-Loir department

References

Communes of Eure-et-Loir